The year 657 BC was a year of the pre-Julian Roman calendar. In the Roman Empire, it was known as year 97 Ab urbe condita . The denomination 657 BC for this year has been used since the early medieval period, when the Anno Domini calendar era became the prevalent method in Europe for naming years.

Events

By place

Asia Minor 

 King Gyges of Lydia establishes a state monopoly in metal coinage, making it illegal for individuals to issue the bean-shaped lumps of electrum used as a medium of exchange in place of commodities (approximate date).

Greece 

 Cypselus becomes the first tyrant of Corinth.

China 

 The Li Ji Unrest, a series of events that ends in 651 BC, initiates when Li Ji, the concubine of Duke Xian of Jin, attempts to have her son Xiqi placed on the throne of Jin.

Births

Deaths

References